William Wilson was a member of the Wisconsin State Senate in 1857. He was also a delegate to the 1876 Republican National Convention.

References

Republican Party Wisconsin state senators
19th-century American politicians
1807 births
1892 deaths